Heroes is a 2008 Indian Hindi film directed by Samir Karnik and starring Salman Khan, Sunny Deol, Bobby Deol, Preity Zinta, Mithun Chakraborty,  Sohail Khan, Vatsal Sheth, and Dino Morea. The film is written by Aseem Arora. Although initially set to be released on 6 June 2008, it was pushed to 24 October 2008, the opening weekend of the holiday Diwali. On 22 November 2008 the script of Heroes was asked to be part of the Academy of Motion Picture Arts and Sciences.

Plot
Two film academy students, Ali (Vatsal Sheth) and Sameer (Sohail Khan), must make a movie in order to graduate. They choose to create a documentary illustrating reasons not to join the Indian Armed Forces, and go on a motorcycle road trip bearing three letters they have been given to deliver — each from a slain soldier to his family.

On their first stop, in Atari, Amritsar, they meet the widow, Kuljeet Kaur (Preity Zinta), and the son, Jasswinder Singh [Jassi] (Dwij Yadav), of a Sikh soldier, Havaldar(Sergeant)Balkar Singh of 8 Sikh Regiment(Salman Khan), who was killed in action three years earlier. The students find that the entire village is very proud of the heroic officer and his sacrifice for the country. When they are flying kites, their kite is cut and it falls beyond a certain fence, in another field. Jassi tells them that the area beyond the fence is Pakistan, and the fence is the Border.

The students' second stop, Himachal, finds them meeting now wheelchair-using Air Force pilot Sqn Leader Vikram Shergill (Sunny Deol), whose Army officer brother, Captain Dhananjay Shergill (Bobby Deol) of 18 Grenadiers had also been killed in action. Vikram is very proud of his brother's sacrifice. and he shows them how he has come to terms with his own grief.

The third letter is to be delivered to a Mr. and Mrs. Naqvi (played by Mithun Chakraborty and Prateeksha Lonkar), but their bike runs out of petrol, and they hitch a ride on a military convoy heading to a nearby base. They see soldiers' coffins in the truck, and the driver quotes an inspiring poem. At the base, they talk to the regiment commander and find another letter by Lt. Sahil Naqvi of Jammu and kashmir Light Infantry(Dino Morea) which they request to deliver themselves. They see that Mrs. Naqvi is busy in a tea party, hardly paying any attention. Sameer accuses her of not loving her son, and says that Sahil was a coward. Mrs. Naqvi plays them a tape which Sahil had recorded after he had saved another soldier's life. She tells him that she and her husband have been affected, and the parties serve as a distraction for them. They leave, but return the next day, and slowly bring the couple's life back to normal.

After completing their film, they reveal in a voice over that although they graduated, they did not go to America (as they had initially planned) because the trip has changed their outlook. They try to join the Army but fail, then start a school to share their experiences. Some years later, Sameer and Ali are walking around their School campus. A man in olive green uniform (Salman Khan) approaches them. This is revealed to be Jassi, the son of the first martyred army officer. Now a strapping young man, he has joined the army like his father, and will soon graduate from the IMA. The movie ends with the statement, "You don't have to be a soldier to love your country".

Cast
Salman Khan in a dual role as
Hav. Balkar Singh; Jassi’s father and Kuljeet's husband (8 Sikh Regiment)
Lt. Jassvinder Singh (Jassi)
Sunny Deol as Sqn.Ldr. Vikram Shergill
Bobby Deol as Captain Dhananjay Shergill (18 Grenadiers)
Preity Zinta as Kuljeet Kaur; Balker's wife and Jassi's mother
Mithun Chakraborty as Dr Maqbool Naqvi
Sohail Khan as Sameer Suri (Saand)
Dino Morea as Lieutenant Sahil Naqvi 12 Jammu and Kashmir Light Infantry
Vatsal Sheth as Ali Nawab Sahab Shah
Amrita Arora as Piya, Saand's girlfriend
Riya Sen as Shivani, Ali's girlfriend
Hrishitaa Bhatt as Saloni, Vikram's girlfriend
Mohnish Behl as Akash Sarin
Prateeksha Lonkar as Mrs Naqvi
Dwij Yadav as young Jassvinder Singh Jassi
Tinnu Anand as Film Institute's director
Vivek Shauq as Professor
Shahab Khan as Sahil's Coach 
Karan Arora as Chotu

Production 
Originally titled Mera Bharat Mahaan (My India is Great), the film was rechristened  Heroes, to avoid sounding jingoistic.

Filming began on 15 June 2007. Salman and Preity are paired opposite each other, in their fifth film together. Shooting took place in Ladakh, Chandigarh, Punjab and Delhi. Some scenes were shot in Pangong Tso featuring Salman Khan, Sohail Khan and Vatsal Sheth.

Soundtrack

Release

Critical reception
Heroes received generally positive reviews from critics. Taran Adarsh of Bollywood Hungama gave the movie 3.5 stars out of 5.

According to The Indian Express the film does manage to say what it set out to; that pride keeps the families of the deceased soldiers going, civilians sleep peacefully only because soldiers give up their lives, and that a country survives only because it has brave soldiers guarding its borders. But it argues the director is too simplistic and that wringing emotion out of so many situations causes even the supreme sacrifice that the soldiers make turn trite. India Times movies give the movie 3 out of 5.

The film's writer Aseem Arora was nominated for a Filmfare Award for Best Story.

Box office
Ths film grossed $326,425 in its opening week. It was a flop at box office.

References

External links
 
 
 

2008 films
2000s Hindi-language films
Films scored by Monty Sharma
Films scored by Sajid–Wajid
Films directed by Samir Karnik